Jonathan Maitland is a British playwright and broadcaster.

Early life 
He was educated at Epsom College and graduated from King's College London with a degree in law.

Journalism 
Maitland started his career as a reporter on The Sutton Guardian. He reported for BBC Radio Bristol and BBC Radio 4's Today programme. He was also a general correspondent for BBC News. From 1995–98 he presented and produced factual shows on BBC 1. A report about annoying dress codes at golf clubs saw him take to the fairways in a black leather mini skirt and a pair of deer antlers. When challenged he pointed out that neither breached the long list of forbidden clothing.

In 1999 he joined ITV to present BAFTA winning current affairs show 'Tonight' and the BAFTA nominated 'House Of Horrors', the first show to secretly film and expose con artists. As an investigative journalist he exposed companies with questionable practices and values. He was employed by ITV from 1999 to 2022.

Writing 
Maitland has written five books including How to Make your Million from the Internet (and what to do if you don't), which explored the dot com boom. How to Survive your Mother described his unconventional childhood in suburban Surrey. Aged three he was sent to boarding school, and at 13 his mother turned the family hotel in Ewell into a retreat for homosexuals. The rights were bought by ITV but no film was made. In 2021, the rights were bought by Captain Dolly, a TV and film production company founded by the actresses Ronni Ancona and Sally Phillips.

His play Dead Sheep, about the Geoffrey Howe speech which led to Margaret Thatcher's downfall, was staged at Park Theatre in London in 2015. It received positive reviews and the Independent called it a "...fine, often very funny debut play." It became the most successful production in the theatre's history and went on a national tour in 2016. His follow-up at the Park, An Audience With Jimmy Savile, broke the previous records set by Dead Sheep. Quentin Letts, reviewing it for the Daily Mail, called it "a striking, memorable, urgent piece of work." The Observer described the play’s central performance by Alistair McGowan as “Uncanny…creepily powerful…shocking.” The show was transferred to the Edinburgh Fringe in August. Maitland's third play, Deny Deny Deny, about medical and ethical dilemmas, was also staged at the Park. The Telegraph called it "a gripping, Faustian take on Olympic doping." 

In May 2019, his play, The Last Temptation of Boris Johnson opened at the Park Theatre. Its two acts looked at how Johnson missed out on the Conservative Party leadership to Theresa May in July 2016 stemming from a February dinner party at his home in Islington with Michael Gove. The second act looks to a future 2029 when he is tempted to make another run at the leadership taking the UK back into the EU. The play broke previous box office records and sold out its entire run but received mixed reviews; Ann Treneman in The Times gave the play four stars out of five, calling it 'politics...served deliciously pink'. In the New European, Martin McQuillan praised Maitland's 'remarkable play' with a five-star review, but Michael Billington in the Guardian gave it two stars, concluding that “ Maitland’s mind-changing hero is not nearly as interesting as he thinks he is.” The play completed an eight week national tour in March 2020.

Other appearances 
Maitland part funded Chris Morris's debut feature film Four Lions (2010) in which he has a cameo as a newsreader.
He also presented 'Profile' and two series of 'Lyrical Journey', both for Radio 4. The latter, which he devised, takes musicians to a place they have written a song about. They then perform it in front of people for whom it has special significance. The series featured songs by the Proclaimers, Squeeze and Billy Bragg.

Personal life 
Maitland's mother Berouia was born in Palestine and his father Ivor in Hackney. Maitland played bass in a covers band, "Surf 'n Turf", for several years. He runs a cricket team, the Riverbank Ramblers, which he founded in 1989 with friends from Epsom College. He is a nationally rated Scrabble player and has made the semi-finals of the UK National Championships twice. He lives in west London with his wife Helena and their son Manny. He has two stepsons.

References

Living people
People educated at Epsom College
Alumni of King's College London
British dramatists and playwrights
British non-fiction writers
British television presenters
Date of birth missing (living people)
Year of birth missing (living people)